Thokoa is a small town in the Mwingi West  Sub-County, Kitui County of Kenya. It's located along the Mwingi - Kitui road. The village got its name from Thokoa rock which 1 KM from the shopping centre.

Populated places in Eastern Province (Kenya)
Geography of Kenya